Philip Byron McKinnely (born July 8, 1954) is a former American football offensive tackle who played seven seasons in the National Football League (NFL), mainly for the Atlanta Falcons, and then in the United States Football League (USFL) for the Memphis Showboats and Birmingham Stallions. After retiring as a player, McKinnely became an American football official, working in college football's Southeastern Conference and NFL Europe before joining the NFL in 2002 as a head linesman. As an official, he wore uniform number 110, and retired following the 2019 NFL season.

He was accused by Samari Rolle of calling him "boy" on December 3, 2007, during a game between the Baltimore Ravens and the New England Patriots. The alleged exchange occurred late in the game when the Patriots retook the lead with 44 seconds remaining.  Several penalties occurred in the closing minutes, including an unsportsmanlike conduct penalty when Raven Linebacker Bart Scott picked up a penalty flag and threw it into the stands in frustration of hearing the banter of Rolle and McKinnely.  After the game, Rolle vented in the locker room to the reporters, "The refs called me a boy. No. 110 called me a boy, I will be calling my agent in the morning and sending my complaint. I have a wife and three kids. Don't call me a boy. Don't call me a boy on the field during a game because I said, 'You've never played football before." The NFL investigated the accusation.

References

1954 births
Living people
African-American players of American football
American football offensive tackles
Atlanta Falcons players
Birmingham Stallions players
Chicago Bears players
College football officials
Los Angeles Rams players
Memphis Showboats players
National Football League officials
Players of American football from Atlanta
Players of American football from Oakland, California
UCLA Bruins football players